The S44 is a railway service of the St. Gallen S-Bahn that runs every two hours between , in the Swiss canton of Thurgau, and  in southern Germany. THURBO, a joint venture of Swiss Federal Railways and the canton of Thurgau, operates the service.

Operations 
In Weinfelden, the S44 connects with the IC 8, which operates to  via Zürich Hauptbahnhof. The hourly –Konstanz InterRegio 75 and half-hourly S14 provide frequent service between Weinfelden and Konstanz.

Route 
  – 

 Weinfelden
 
 Konstanz

History 
The S44 began operation with the 11 December 2022 timetable change. Track capacity constraints limit operation to every two hours; future plans call for increased service.

References

External links 
 Fahrplan Ost

St. Gallen S-Bahn lines
Rail transport in Baden-Württemberg
Transport in Thurgau